Baile Chuind Chétchathaig ("The Vision of Conn of the Hundred Battles") is an Old Irish list of Kings of Tara or High Kings of Ireland which survives in two 16th-century manuscripts, 23 N 10 and Egerton 88. It is the earliest such king-list known, probably dating from around 700 AD. The later Baile In Scáil is closely related.

Date
Baile Chuind Chétchathaig was first edited by Rudolf Thurneysen who dated it to about 700 AD and believed it to have been included in the lost Cín Dromma Snechtai manuscript. Thurneysen later revised this opinion on the basis of the content of the poem, supposing that the poem's "Glúnshalach" represented 10th-century king Niall Glúndub. Later editors and writers have generally preferred Thurneysen's first estimate, taking the work to have been begun in the lifetime of Fínsnechta Fledach (died 695).

In recent studies Edel Bhreathnach has suggested that the current form of the poem may be somewhat later: while the kings who follow Fínsnechta were previously interpreted as imagined future kings, he suggests that these are in fact historical figures from the first quarter of the eighth century disguised by kennings.

Content and context

Analogues

Notes

References

 
 
 
 
 
 Gerard Murphy, "On the Dates of Two Sources Used in Thurneysen's Heldensage: I. Baile Chuind and the date of Cín Dromma Snechtai", in Ériu 16 (1952): 145-51. includes edition and translation.

External links
 Baile Chuinn Cétchathaigh, a summary

Irish texts
Early Irish literature
Early medieval literature
King lists